Adam Gomez is an American politician, who represented Ward 1 on the Springfield City Council, first taking office in January 2016 and the Hampden District in the Massachusetts Senate. In January 2020, he was selected as vice president of the council.

During the September 1, 2020, Democratic primary, Gomez defeated incumbent Jim Welch to become the Democratic Party nominee for the Massachusetts State Senator from the Hampden District - encompassing Springfield, West Springfield, and Chicopee. Gomez was elected to the seat during the November 3, 2020, general election while unopposed, becoming the Commonwealth's first state senator of Puerto Rican descent.

Prior to his first election in November 2015, Gomez worked as a community organizer in Springfield. He lives in the Brightwood neighborhood of Springfield, and is affiliated with the Democratic Party.

See also
 2021–2022 Massachusetts legislature

References 

21st-century American politicians
American politicians of Puerto Rican descent
Hispanic and Latino American state legislators in Massachusetts
Living people
Democratic Party Massachusetts state senators
People from Springfield, Massachusetts
Year of birth missing (living people)